

Crown
Head of State - Queen Elizabeth II

Federal government
Governor General - Jeanne Sauvé

Cabinet
Prime Minister -  Brian Mulroney
Deputy Prime Minister - Don Mazankowski
Minister of Finance - Michael Wilson
Secretary of State for External Affairs - Joe Clark
Secretary of State for Canada - David Crombie
Minister of National Defence - Perrin Beatty
Minister of National Health and Welfare - Jake Epp
Minister of Regional Industrial Expansion - Michel Côté then Robert de Cotret
Minister of the Environment - Thomas McMillan
Minister of Justice - Ray Hnatyshyn
Minister of Transport - John Crosbie
Minister of Communications - Flora MacDonald
Minister of Fisheries and Oceans - Tom Siddon
Minister of Agriculture - John Wise
Minister of Public Works - Stewart McInnes
Minister of Employment and Immigration - Benoît Bouchard
Minister of Indian Affairs and Northern Development - Bill McKnight
Minister of Energy and Resources - Marcel Masse
Minister of State (Forestry and Mines) - Gerald Merrithew

Parliament
See: 33rd Canadian parliament

Party leaders
Progressive Conservative Party of Canada -  Brian Mulroney
Liberal Party of Canada - John Turner
New Democratic Party- Ed Broadbent

Supreme Court Justices
Chief Justice: Brian Dickson
William McIntyre
Bertha Wilson
Antonio Lamer
Gérard V. La Forest
John Sopinka
Jean Beetz
Julien Chouinard then Claire L'Heureux-Dubé
Gerald Eric Le Dain

Other
Speaker of the House of Commons - John Allen Fraser
Governor of the Bank of Canada - Gerald Bouey then John Crow
Chief of the Defence Staff - General P.D. Manson

Provinces

Premiers
Premier of Alberta - Don Getty
Premier of British Columbia - Bill Vander Zalm
Premier of Manitoba - Howard Pawley
Premier of New Brunswick - Richard Hatfield then Frank McKenna
Premier of Newfoundland - Brian Peckford
Premier of Nova Scotia - John Buchanan
Premier of Ontario - David Peterson
Premier of Prince Edward Island - Joe Ghiz
Premier of Quebec - Robert Bourassa
Premier of Saskatchewan - Grant Devine

Lieutenant-governors
Lieutenant-Governor of Alberta - Helen Hunley
Lieutenant-Governor of British Columbia - Robert Gordon Rogers
Lieutenant-Governor of Manitoba - George Johnson
Lieutenant-Governor of New Brunswick - George F.G. Stanley then Gilbert Finn
Lieutenant-Governor of Newfoundland and Labrador - James Aloysius McGrath
Lieutenant-Governor of Nova Scotia -Alan Abraham
Lieutenant-Governor of Ontario - Lincoln Alexander
Lieutenant-Governor of Prince Edward Island - Robert Lloyd George MacPhail
Lieutenant-Governor of Quebec - Gilles Lamontagne
Lieutenant-Governor of Saskatchewan - Sylvia Fedoruk

Mayors
Toronto - Art Eggleton
Montreal - Jean Doré
Vancouver - Gordon Campbell
Ottawa - James A. Durrell

Religious leaders
Roman Catholic Bishop of Quebec - Cardinal Archbishop Louis-Albert Vachon
Roman Catholic Bishop of Montreal -  Cardinal Archbishop Paul Grégoire
Roman Catholic Bishops of London - Bishop John Michael Sherlock
Moderator of the United Church of Canada - Anne M. Squire

See also
1986 Canadian incumbents
Events in Canada in 1987
1988 Canadian incumbents
 Governmental leaders in 1987
Canadian incumbents by year

1987
Incumbents
Canadian leaders